Riverside is an album by trumpeter Dave Douglas, saxophonist Chet Doxas, bassist Steve Swallow and drummer Jim Doxas which was released in April 2014 on Douglas' Greenleaf Music label. The group is inspired by the works of Jimmy Giuffre.

Reception

JazzTimes said "the most satisfying moments generally occur when Douglas is flexing his brawny tone and agile ideas to seize the spotlight or support his fellow horn player". On All About Jazz Troy Collins stated "Riverside pays homage to Giuffre's progressive concepts through the creation of new works that draw inspiration from his oeuvre, rather than merely rehashing it. The deceptive simplicity of folk-based themes, rich harmonic counterpoint and subtle rhythmic interplay are the basic foundations of Giuffre's aesthetic—aspects Riverside makes its own on this vibrant premiere".

Track listing
All compositions by Dave Douglas except as indicated
 "Thrush" - 6:41
 "The Train and the River" (Jimmy Giuffre) - 2:27
 "Old Church, New Paint (Intro)" (Chet Doxas) - 2:08
 "Old Church, New Paint" (Doxas) - 4:29
 "Handwritten Letter" - 6:07
 "Big Shorty" (Doxas) - 6:48
 "Front Yard" - 3:59
 "Backyard" - 7:18
 "No Good Without You" - 6:07 		
 "Travelin' Light" (Trummy Young, Jimmy Mundy, Johnny Mercer) - 4:24
 "Sing on the Mountain High/Northern Miner"  (Doxas) - 11:56

Personnel
Dave Douglas - trumpet
Chet Doxas - clarinet, saxophone
Steve Swallow - electric bass
Jim Doxas - drums

References

2014 albums
Dave Douglas (trumpeter) albums
Greenleaf Music albums